A Gangsta's Pain is the fourth studio album by American rapper Moneybagg Yo. It was released on April 23, 2021, through Roc Nation, Collective Music Group, Bread Gang Entertainment, N-Less Entertainment, and Interscope Records. The album features guest appearances from Kaash Paige, Big30, Future, Tripstar, Polo G, Lil Durk, Jhené Aiko, and Pharrell Williams. The album debuted atop the US Billboard 200, earning 110,000 album-equivalent units, becoming Moneybagg Yo's first US number-one album. The deluxe edition with 6 new songs was released on October 22, 2021, with additional guest appearances from EST Gee, Pooh Shiesty, Big Homiie G, Yung Bleu, Janiyah, Lil Wayne, Ashanti, and DJ Khaled.

Background 
In 2020, Moneybagg Yo released two projects: his third studio album, Time Served, and Code Red, a collaborative mixtape with fellow American rapper Blac Youngsta. Both projects debuted and peaked in the top 10 of the Billboard 200, at number 3 and number 6, respectively. The former album was certified gold by the Recording Industry Association of America (RIAA).

Release and promotion
On March 12, 2021, Moneybagg Yo announced that the album was completed and ready to go with it being released in 2021, but did not have an exact release date planned. He subtly revealed the title of the album on March 26, 2021, the same day that he and American rapper Future released the single "Hard for the Next", the second single from A Gangsta's Pain. However, he revealed its title explicitly along with its cover and pre-order link through social media on April 14, 2021. The track listing was revealed on April 21, 2021, but was shared the previous day on Apple Music.

Singles 
"Time Today" was released as the lead single of the album alongside the official music video on February 3, 2021. "Hard for the Next", a collaboration with American rapper Future, was released on March 26, 2021, as the album's second single. "Wockesha" was sent to rhythmic contemporary radio on August 10, 2021, as the third single. "Scorpio" from the deluxe edition was sent to rhythmic contemporary radio on November 16, 2021, as the fourth single.

The first and only promotional single, "Go", a collaboration with American rapper Big30, was released on April 14, 2021, the same day Moneybagg Yo announced the album.

Critical reception 

Nadine Smith of Pitchfork rated the album 6.8 out of 10, writing "At his best, the stalwart Memphis rapper excels at heart-on-sleeve, bluesy songwriting, and his new album shows him deepening and opening up." Writing for HipHopDX, Josh Svetz rated the album 3.8 out of 5, saying "Atlanta trap, Southern pain rap, etc., Moneybagg possesses an innate ability to ride on all the trending sounds and help boost a song with his presence: a welcome addition to any single."

Commercial performance 
A Gangsta's Pain debuted atop the US Billboard 200 dated May 8, 2021, earning 110,000 album-equivalent units in its first week, with almost all of this figure coming from streams. In its second week, the album dropped to number two on the chart, earning an additional 70,000 units. The album returned to number one on the chart in its third week, earning an additional 61,000 units.

Track listing 

A Gangsta's Pain: Reloaded track listing adds these seven tracks to the beginning of the original album:
"Switches & Dracs" (featuring Lil Durk and EST Gee) – 2:13
"Wat Be Wrong??" – 2:11
"Gave It" (featuring Big Homiie G) – 2:52
"This Feeling" (featuring Yung Bleu and Ja'niyah) – 3:28
"Scorpio" – 2:45
"Another One" (with DJ Khaled) – 3:40
"Wockesha" (Remix with Lil Wayne and Ashanti) – 3:37

Sample credits
 "Wockesha" contains samples from "Stay with Me", performed by DeBarge.
 "Hard for the Next" contains samples from "Differences", performed by Ginuwine.
 "Scorpio" contains samples from "How's It Goin' Down", performed by DMX.

Personnel
Credits adapted from Tidal.

 Moneybagg Yo – rap vocals
 Anjae Rayford – additional vocals 
 Trenten DeWick – additional vocals 
 Pharrell Williams – background vocals 
 Colin Leonard – mastering engineer
 Ari Morris – mixer
 Real Red – recording engineer
 Mike Larson – recording engineer 
 Logan Schmitz – assistant mixer 
 Ben Sedano – assistant recording engineer 
 Morgan David – assistant recording engineer

Charts

Weekly charts

Year-end charts

Certifications

References

2021 albums
Moneybagg Yo albums
Collective Music Group albums